The Men's road race of the 2020 UCI Road World Championships was a cycling event that took place on 27 September 2020 in Imola, Italy. Mads Pedersen was the defending champion, but he did not compete in the race.

For the first time since 1997, a French male rider won the rainbow jersey as Julian Alaphilippe attacked on the final climb of the Cima Gallisterna; he managed to hold off a chasing group of five riders by 24 seconds to take victory at the finish line, at the Autodromo Internazionale Enzo e Dino Ferrari. The silver medal went to Belgium's Wout van Aert – his second of the week – while the bronze medal was taken by Marc Hirschi from Switzerland.

The race took place on a  course, starting and finishing at the Autodromo Internazionale Enzo e Dino Ferrari (a motor racing circuit). Heading out from the Autodromo into the Emilia-Romagna countryside, the course used two climbs with an average gradient of 10% separated by the town of Riolo Terme, before returning to the Autodromo.

Qualification
Qualification was based mainly on the UCI World Ranking by nations as of 17 March 2020.

UCI World Rankings
The following nations qualified.

Participating nations
177 cyclists from 43 nations competed in the event. The number of cyclists per nation is shown in parentheses.

Final classification
177 cyclists were listed to start the -long course. However, Alexey Lutsenko was forced to withdraw from the race after testing positive for COVID-19, while Nikias Arndt and Natnael Berhane also did not start. 88 riders completed the full distance.

References

External links

Men's road race
UCI Road World Championships – Men's road race
2020 in men's road cycling